Youssef Essaiydy (born 16 August 1994) is a Moroccan professional footballer who plays as a midfielder. He last played for RS Berkane.

Career statistics

References

External links
 
 Youssef Essiaydy profile at Foot-National.com
 

1994 births
Living people
Moroccan footballers
Footballers from Casablanca
Association football midfielders
Chamois Niortais F.C. players
RS Berkane players
Ligue 2 players
Moroccan expatriate footballers
Botola players
Moroccan expatriate sportspeople in France
Expatriate footballers in France